Gertrud is a novel written by Hermann Hesse, first published in 1910. It has been published into English by Peter Owen Publishers, London.

Plot summary

Styled as the memoir of a famous composer named Kuhn, Gertrud tells of his childhood and young adult years before it comes to the heart of the story; his relationships to two troubled artists, the eponymous Gertrud Imthor, and the opera singer Heinrich Muoth.  Kuhn is drawn to Gertrud upon their first encounter, but she falls in love with and marries Muoth, whom the composer befriended as well some years before.  The two are hopelessly ill-matched, and their destructive relationship provides the basis for Kuhn's magnum opus.

Analysis 

Like many of Hesse's novels, there is a strong influence derived from Nietzsche, specifically his work The Birth of Tragedy.  Muoth represents the passionate Dionysian elements of art, while Gertrud represents the more refined Apollonian elements.  The fact that Kuhn's opera is the result of their relationship suggests the combining of the two elements to form a work of high art.

1910 German-language novels
German philosophical novels
Novels by Hermann Hesse
Novels about composers
Novels about music
1910 German novels